Victorian Premier Cricket is a club cricket competition in the state of Victoria administered by Cricket Victoria. Each club fields four teams (firsts through to fourths) of adult players and usually play on weekends and public holidays. Matches are played on turf wickets under limited-time rules, with most results being decided on a first-innings basis.

Outstanding players in the competition are selected to play for the Victorian Bushrangers at first-class and List A level, in the Sheffield Shield and Marsh One Day Cup competitions respectively. The competition commenced in the 1906–07 season when it was known as "District cricket", and was renamed in 1990. Separate competitions for one-day matches (2002–03) and Twenty20 (2005–06) were later established.

History
Inter-club cricket in Melbourne had its beginnings during the 1850s, with matches arranged on an informal basis. The newspapers usually decided the season's best team via the consensus of journalists. In 1870, the Challenge Cup was introduced, beginning an era of more structured competition.

For the 1889–90 season, a program of Pennant Matches was devised over eight rounds, which began the era of club competition recognisable today. The original competing teams were Carlton, East Melbourne, Essendon, Fitzroy, Melbourne, North Melbourne, Port Melbourne, Richmond, St Kilda, South Melbourne, university and Williamstown. There were no restriction on the recruitment of players and the stronger clubs (such as East Melbourne, Melbourne and South Melbourne) attracted the leading players, and other teams remained very weak. By the turn of the twentieth century, the unevenness of the competition resulted in a lack of public support.

The solution was found in "electorate" or "District" cricket whereby players needed a residential qualification to play for their club. In 1903, a VCA sub-committee recommended the implementation of the system. Due to many differences of opinion (most notably, the powerful Melbourne Cricket Club dissented), District cricket did not commence until 1906.

The twelve inaugural District teams were Carlton, Collingwood (newly formed), East Melbourne, Essendon, Fitzroy, Hawksburn (which became Prahran the following year), Melbourne, North Melbourne, Richmond, St Kilda, South Melbourne and University. A promotion and relegation system between two grades was originally envisioned, and the premier club of second grade, Northcote, was promoted for 1907–08. However, last-placed Collingwood was not relegated and the idea dispensed with. The second grade was re-constituted as the Victorian Sub-District competition, comprising Brighton, Caulfield, Coburg, Elsternwick, Hawthorn, Malvern, Port Melbourne and Williamstown.

The uneven number of teams necessitated a bye, which remained 1929–30 when the VCA Colts team was included. The Colts team competed for eleven seasons but disbanded during World War II. Matches continued through the war (although they were not for points) and Footscray was admitted for 1948–49, which eliminated the bye. The next expansion occurred in 1974 when two clubs representing outer-suburban areas, Ringwood and Waverley, were promoted from Sub-District. Eighteen sides have participated since 1993–94 when teams from Geelong and the Mornington Peninsula were admitted. The finals system, previously consisting of four teams, was enlarged to a final six in 1997–98 season, later changing to a final eight.

Current clubs

Premierships correct to the end of 2021/22 season.

First XI premierships
Two-day

1906-07 East Melbourne (1)
1907-08 East Melbourne (2)
1908-09 Prahran (1)
1909-10 St Kilda (1)
1910-11 Prahran (2)
1911-12 Northcote (1)
1912-13 Collingwood (1)
1913-14 St Kilda (2)
1914-15 Melbourne (1)
1915-16 Not held
1916-17 Not held
1917-18 Not held
1918-19 Not held
1919-20 Melbourne (2)
1920-21 Prahran (3)
1921-22 Prahran (4)
1922-23 Prahran (5)
1923-24 St Kilda (3)
1924-25 St Kilda (4)
1925-26 St Kilda (5)
1926-27 St Kilda (6)
1927-28 Hawthorn-East Melbourne (3)
1928-29 University (1)
1929-30 Melbourne (3)
1930-31 Fitzroy (1)
1931-32 St Kilda (7)
1932-33 Melbourne (4)
1933-34 St Kilda (8)
1934-35 Melbourne (5)
1935-36 Melbourne (6)
1936-37 Melbourne (7)
1937-38 Melbourne (8)
1938-39 Fitzroy (2)
1939-40 Fitzroy (3)
1940-41 Not held
1941-42 Not held
1942-43 Not held
1943-44 Not held
1944-45 Not held

1945-46 Carlton (1)
1946-47 Richmond (1)
1947-48 Carlton (2)
1948-49 Melbourne (9)
1949-50 Hawthorn-East Melbourne (4)
1950-51 Hawthorn-East Melbourne (5)
1951-52 Melbourne (10)
1952-53 South Melbourne (1)
1953-54 Fitzroy (4)
1954-55 Prahran (6)
1955-56 Hawthorn-East Melbourne (6)
1956-57 Carlton (3)
1957-58 Carlton (4)
1958-59 Melbourne (11)
1959-60 South Melbourne (2)
1960-61 Fitzroy (5)
1961-62 St Kilda (9)
1962-63 Hawthorn-East Melbourne (7)
1963-64 Essendon (1)
1964-65 St Kilda (10)
1965-66 Northcote (2)
1966-67 Fitzroy (6)
1967-68 South Melbourne (3)
1968-69 Carlton (5)
1969-70 Essendon (2)
1970-71 Collingwood (2)
1971-72 Hawthorn-East Melbourne (8)
1972-73 Melbourne (12)
1973-74 Northcote (3)
1974-75 Collingwood (3)
1975-76 Melbourne (13)
1976-77 Richmond (2)
1977-78 Carlton (6)
1978-79 Carlton (7)
1979-80 Footscray (1)
1980-81 Carlton (8)
1981-82 Melbourne (14)
1982-83 Richmond (3)

1983-84 Prahran (7)
1984-85 St Kilda (11)
1985-86 St Kilda (12)
1986-87 Northcote (4)
1987-88 Collingwood (4)
1988-89 Melbourne (15)
1989-90 Richmond (4)
1990-91 University (2)
1991-92 St Kilda (13)
1992-93 Melbourne (16)
1993-94 Fitzroy Doncaster (7)
1994-95 Melbourne (17)
1995-96 University (3)
1996-97 Northcote (5)
1997-98 Melbourne (18)
1998-99 Hawthorn-Waverley (9)
1999-00 Richmond (5)
2000-01 St Kilda (14)
2001-02 Fitzroy Doncaster (8)
2002-03 St Kilda (15)
2003-04 St Kilda (16)
2004-05 St Kilda (17)
2005-06 St Kilda (18)
2006-07 Dandenong (1)
2007-08 Ringwood (1)
2008-09 Ringwood (2)
2009-10 Melbourne (19)
2010-11 Dandenong (2)
2011-12 Richmond (6)
2012-13 Melbourne (20)
2013-14 Footscray Edgewater (2)
2014-15 Ringwood (3)
2015-16 Fitzroy Doncaster (9)
2016-17 Fitzroy Doncaster (10)
2017-18 Dandenong (3)
2018-19 Carlton (9)
2019-20 Melbourne (21)
2020-21 Prahran (8)
2021-22 Carlton (10)
Source

One-day/White-ball

2002-03 Prahran (1)
2003-04 Northcote (1)
2004-05 St Kilda (1)
2005-06 St Kilda (2)
2006-07 St Kilda (3)
2007-08 Carlton (1)

2008-09 Melbourne (1)
2009-10 St Kilda (4)
2010-11 Carlton (2)
2011-12 Prahran (2)
2012-13 Melbourne (2)
2013-14 Melbourne (3)

2014-15 Monash Tigers (1)
2015-16 Fitzroy Doncaster (1)
2016-17 Melbourne (4)
2017-18 Dandenong (1)
Source

Twenty-20

2005-06 Richmond (1)
2006-07 Dandenong (1)
2007-08 Melbourne (1)

2008-09 St Kilda (1)
2009-10 Geelong (1)
2010-11 Not held

2011-12 Prahran (1)
2012-13 Melbourne (2)
2013-14 Footscray Edgewater (1)
Source

Ryder Medal
First presented in 1972–73, the award for the best player of the season is named after Jack Ryder, the former Australian captain who had a long and distinguished career with Collingwood.

John Scholes Medal
Presented in season 2001–02 under the name of Cricket Victoria Medal, the John Scholes medal is awarded to the best player in the Victorian Premier Cricket 1st XI final. The name was changed for the 2003–04 season.

Administration
Victorian Premier Cricket was run by the Cricket Victoria's Pennant Committee until the end of the 2013/14 season. The role of the Pennant Committee was in relation to dealings with grounds, fixtures, playing dates, venues, umpires, ladders, player eligibility and registrations, disputes, rules changes etc. The Pennant Committee comprised five delegates elected at the AGM of Cricket Victoria held every August. The members of the final Pennant Committee were John McConville (chairman), Kevan Carroll, John Malligan, Ken Stone, Oswin Wright and Peter Binns (ex-officio).  Matters concerning player behaviour are dealt with a tribunal convened by Cricket Victoria and is made up of an independent chairman two Pennant Committee members, providing that their club is not involved in the match in question.

Since 2014/15, the Premier Cricket Management Team (PCMT) began overseeing the administration of Premier Cricket at Cricket Victoria. As of season 2021/22, this has now become a Premier Cricket Department listed in charge of the day-to-day operations with Victorian Premier Cricket.

See also
 Cricket in Australia
 Victorian Sub-District Cricket Association

References

External links
 List of 1st XI premiers
 

 
Grade cricket competitions in Australia
Cricket in Victoria (Australia)
Recurring sporting events established in 1906
1906 establishments in Australia
Sports leagues established in 1906